Paragorgopsis amoena is a species of ulidiid or picture-winged fly in the genus Paragorgopsis of the family Ulidiidae.

References

Ulidiidae